Kool and the Gang is the debut studio album by funk band Kool & the Gang. The album was released in December 1969, and charted on the Billboard R&B album chart at #43.

Singles
Singles "Kool and the Gang" and "Let The Music Take Your Mind" both reached No. 19 on the Billboard Hot R&B Songs chart.

Track listing
De-Lite Records – DE-2003:

Personnel
 Dennis "D.T." Thomas – alto saxophone, flute, percussion, vocals
 Khalis Bayyan –  tenor and soprano saxophones, alto flute, vocals
 Robert "Spike" Mickens –  trumpet, flugelhorn, vocals
 Claydes Smith – guitars
 Woody Sparrow – guitars
 Ricky West –  keyboards, piano, vocals
 Robert "Kool" Bell –  bass, vocals
 George "Funky" Brown –  drums, percussion, vocals

Singles
"Kool & The Gang"/"Raw Hamburger" (#19 R&B/#59 pop) (1969)
"The Gang's Back Again"/"Kool's Back Again" (#37/#85) (1969) 
"Let the Music Take Your Mind"/"Chocolate Buttermilk" (#19/#78) (1970)

References

1969 debut albums
Kool & the Gang albums
De-Lite Records albums